The 2014–15 Florida Atlantic Owls women's basketball team represented Florida Atlantic University during the 2014–15 NCAA Division I women's basketball season. The Owls, led by third year head coach Kellie Lewis-Jay, play their home games at FAU Arena and were members of Conference USA. They finished the season 13–17, 7–11 in C-USA play to finish in a tie for tenth place. They lost in the first round of the C-USA women's tournament to Louisiana Tech.

Roster

Schedule

|-
!colspan=9 style="background:#003366; color:#CE2029;"| Exhibition

|-
!colspan=9 style="background:#003366; color:#CE2029;"| Regular season

|-
!colspan=9 style="background:#003366; color:#CE2029;"| Conference USA Tournament

See also
 2014–15 Florida Atlantic Owls men's basketball team

References

Florida Atlantic Owls women's basketball seasons
Florida Atlantic